Helen Hull Law (February 26, 1890 – November 11, 1966) was a professor of Latin and Greek at Meredith College in Raleigh, North Carolina from 1914 until 1927 where her "depth and breadth of scholarship would have frightened the freshmen had not her charming shyness made them feel that they must put her at ease." In 1923 she founded and organized the Kappa Nu Sigma honor society on campus. Law later became professor of Greek at Wellesley College and retired in 1954 after 28 years.

Life 
She graduated from Vassar College in 1911.

In 1932, Law published Bibliography of Greek Myth in English Poetry, with a Supplement published in 1941. In 1955, a revised edition was published which combines the two.

Among Law's published articles are "Studies in the Songs of Plautine Comedy" (a 1922 dissertation), which was reviewed by Cornelia C. Coulter (Classical Philology, 1922), "The Name Galatea in the Pygmalion Myth" (The Classical Journal, February 1932) and "Pater's Use of Greek Quotations" (Modern Language Notes, December 1943).

Helen Hull Law died at the age of seventy-six in Winter Park, Florida in November 1966.

Works
Studies in the songs of Plautine comedy Menasha, Wis.: George Banta, University of Chicago 1922.

External links

References

1890 births
1966 deaths
People from Brooklyn
Vassar College alumni
Meredith College faculty
Wellesley College faculty